A list of films produced by the Israeli film industry in 1961.

1961 releases

See also
1961 in Israel

References

External links
 Israeli films of 1961 at the Internet Movie Database

Israeli
Film
1961